Michael Logan is an American jazz bassist. He worked with, among others, Muhal Richard Abrams, Walter Bishop jr., Artie 
Simmons and the Jazz Samaritans, Clifford Jordan.

In 1974 he collaborated with the Italian singer-songwriter and musician Giuni Russo, in writing her first album, Love is a woman (1975), entirely in English. In particular, he wrote the entire song Every time you leave.

Discography
 1990: Night Out (Muse Records) with Cecil Brooks III, Benny Green, Joe Ford, Houston Person

Songs written for other artists
 1975: Love is a woman for Giuni Russo (lyrics by Giuni Russo, music by Michael Logan), released on Love is a woman;
 1975: Everytime you leave for Giuni Russo (lyrics and music by Michael Logan), released on Love is a woman;
 1975: Carol for Giuni Russo (lyrics by Giuni Russo, music by Michael Logan), released on Love is a woman;
 1975: Suddenly I'm alone for Giuni Russo (lyrics by Giuni Russo, music by Michael Logan), released on Love is a woman;
 1975: Acting the part for Giuni Russo (lyrics by Giuni Russo, music by Michael Logan), released on Love is a woman;
 1975: Give me one reason for Giuni Russo (lyrics by Giuni Russo, music by Michael Logan), released on Love is a woman;
 1975: If you really wanna say goodbye for Giuni Russo (lyrics by Giuni Russo, music by Michael Logan), released on Love is a woman;

References

American jazz bass guitarists
American male bass guitarists
Muse Records artists
1948 births
Living people
20th-century American bass guitarists
20th-century American male musicians
American male jazz musicians